This article gives an overview of liberalism in Panama. It is limited to liberal parties with substantial support, mainly proved by having had a representation in parliament. The sign ⇒ means a reference to another party in that scheme. For inclusion in this scheme it isn't necessary so that parties labeled themselves as a liberal party.

Introduction
Liberalism in Panama derived from liberalism in Colombia. The liberal current is one of the main political currents in Panama. The National Liberal Party (Partido Liberal Nacional), observer LI) is a left of center liberal party, as is the Nationalist Republican Liberal Movement (Partido Movimiento Liberal Republicano Nacionalista).

The timeline

(National) Liberal Party
1903: At the independence of Panama the Panama section of the Colombian Liberal Party established the Liberal Party (Partido Liberal), led by Belisario Porras.
1940: The party is renamed into the National Liberal Party (Partido Liberal Nacional).
1970: The party is banned.
1981: The party is allowed to register again.
1987: Factions formed the ⇒ Progressive Liberal Party and the ⇒ Authentic Liberal Party.
1989: The Progressive Liberal Party rejoined the party and its leader, Roderick Esquivel becomes party leader.

Nationalist Republican Liberal Movement
1981: A faction of the liberal current established the Nationalist Republican Liberal Movement (Movimento Liberal Republicano Nacionalista).

Progressive Liberal Party
1987: A faction of the ⇒ National Liberal Party formed the Progressive Liberal Party (Partido Liberal Progresista), led by Roderick Esquivel.
1989: The party rejoined the National Liberal Party.

Authentic Liberal Party
1987: A faction of the ⇒ National Liberal Party formed the conservative liberal anti-authoritarian Authentic Liberal Party (Partido Liberal Auténtico), led by Arnulfo Escalona Ríos.
1999: The party lost registration.

Liberal leaders

See also
 History of Panama
 Politics of Panama
 List of political parties in Panama

References 

Panama
Political movements in Panama